Sambor may refer to:

People
 Sambor, a prince of Rugia (Rügen)
 Sambor I, Duke of Pomerania ( 1150 –  1207), regent of Pomerelia
 Sambor II, Duke of Pomerania ( 1212 –  1278, duke of Pomerania and prince of Lubiszewo Tczewskie

Places
 Sambir, Ukraine
 Sambor, Altai Krai, Russia
 Sombor, a city in West Bačka District, Serbia
 Samobor, a city in Zagreb County, Croatia
 Sambor Dam, a proposed dam and hydroelectric power station on the Mekong, in Prek Kampi District, Kratie Province, Cambodia

See also
 
 Sambor Prei Kuk, an historical site north of the town of Kampong Thom, Cambodia
 Samborski (disambiguation)
 Samborzec, a village in Sandomierz County, Świętokrzyskie Voivodeship, south-central Poland
 Sambro (disambiguation)